Jeffery Self (born February 19, 1987) is an American actor, writer, and comedian.

Early life
Self is a native of Georgia, who grew up in the South. After attending middle school, Self persuaded his parents to let him be homeschooled to avoid dealing in high school with the fact that he was gay.

Career
Self has appeared in many television shows as a recurring, featured or guest actor. He and Cole Escola starred in the sketch comedy series Jeffery & Cole Casserole, which aired on Logo TV for two seasons. He has also appeared in Desperate Housewives, 90210, Hot In Cleveland, Torchwood, Shameless, Difficult People, and as Liz Lemon's cousin Randy Lemon on NBC's 30 Rock. He is the author of two humor books: Fifty Shades Of Gay and Straight People: A Spotters Guide, as well as the young adult novels A Very Very Bad Thing and Drag Teen. He co-wrote, produced, and starred in the indie horror/comedy cult hit You're Killing Me. He was the host of the MTV series, Scream: After Dark, a talk show devoted to deleted scenes and interviews with the cast of the popular MTV horror series Scream. He most recently played Marc Doober on Search Party on HBO Max.

Personal life
Self is gay. He dated Patrick McDonald of Fire Island for three years and publicly blogged about their breakup. On January 8, 2017, Self and his boyfriend, Augustus Prew, announced their engagement via Instagram. They were married on January 13, 2018, in Culver City, California.

Filmography

Film

Television

References

External links
 Jeffery Self at Tumblr

American male television actors
Living people
1987 births
American gay actors
American gay writers
Gay comedians
LGBT people from Georgia (U.S. state)
American LGBT comedians